Kashar is a village and a former municipality in the Tirana County, central Albania. The population at the 2011 census was 43,353.

History 
The village was first attested in 1456 as the battlefield of a battle between the League of Lezhë and the Ottoman Empire.

At the 2015 local government reform it became a subdivision of the municipality Tirana.

Demographics 
Kashar consists of ten communities with a total population of c. 21,000 inhabitants.

Economy

Kashar is the industrial hub of Tirana with many big companies located there. The biggest Albanian company that is located there is ALBtelecom, a privately owned company that offers telecommunication services. There is also Coca-Cola Bottling Shqipëria. Kashar's economy also relies on agriculture and housing due to a huge influx of people coming to Tirana. Kashar also hosts one of Tirana's main parks, Kashar Park around Kus village reservoir, and the television station Top Channel.

International relations
Kashar is twinned with:
 Sindos, Thessaloniki regional unit, Greece

References

Administrative units of Tirana
Former municipalities in Tirana County
Villages in Tirana County